Clare Clifford is a British actress, comedian and drama lecturer who appeared in the television dramas Angels and This Life.

She attended Selwyn Independent School for Girls in Matson, Gloucester, then studied at the Royal Central School of Speech and Drama and appeared on stage at the Oxford Playhouse and the National Theatre. Other television credits include Doctor Who, Bergerac, Cardiac Arrest, Peak Practice, The Bill, Cider with Rosie, Torchwood, and Casualty. In 2021, she appeared in an episode of the BBC soap opera Doctors as Patricia Stanton.

Clifford has made the transition from actress to feminist stand-up comedian and performed her routine at the Bad Wolf Doctor Who convention in Birmingham, July 2007. In 2010 she gained an MA in screenwriting from the London College of Communication which is part of the University of the Arts London.

References

External links
 

British film actresses
British television actresses
Living people
Alumni of the London College of Communication
Year of birth missing (living people)